Sefteh (also known as Sefteh-ye Fatḩābād) is a village in Fathabad Rural District, in the Central District of Baft County, Kerman Province, Iran. At the 2006 census, its population was 26, in 13 families.

References 

Populated places in Baft County